Oliver "Oli" Steadman is a British-South African multi-instrumentalist.

Stornoway
Steadman was a founding member of Stornoway.

Other Projects 
Studying sound engineering while on the road with Stornoway, Steadman developed a reputation as a studio producer and live sound director, while managing & mentoring local musicians including Willie J Healey and Balloon Ascents/NEVERLND.

Steadman founded Count Drachma in 2013, with whom he still sometimes performs. Count Drachma were invited to play at festivals from WOMAD to WOOD to Festival N°6, co-headlined London's Southbank Centre with the Mahotella Queens, and filmed a documentary with The Guardian's Education channel.

Steadman founded music-tech startup Tigmus in 2014 with Stornoway's touring trumpet player Thomas Hodgson.

Steadman has been endorsed by Aria Bass Guitars since 2015.

References

External links
Oli Steadman on Twitter

South African emigrants to the United Kingdom
Bass guitarists
Living people
1987 births
Musicians from Johannesburg
21st-century bass guitarists